Indianola is a city in Warren County, Iowa, United States, located  south of downtown Des Moines, Iowa.  The population was 15,833 at the time of the 2020 census. It is the county seat of Warren County.  Indianola is home to the National Balloon Classic, a nine-day hot air balloon festival held annually in the summer, the Des Moines Metro Opera, a world renowned major American Summer Opera Festival, and Simpson College.

History
Indianola was founded in 1849 as the county seat of Warren County. The town was located near the geographic center of the new county. The town's name was taken from a newspaper account of a Texas ghost town of the same name.

Indianola was incorporated in 1863.

Geography
The Summerset Trail's southern terminus is in Indianola.

Climate

According to the Köppen climate classification system, Indianola has a hot-summer humid continental climate, abbreviated "Dfa" on climate maps.

Demographics

In 2005, a special census was conducted that revised Indianola's population to 14,156.

As of 2013, there were 15,108 people, 5,477 households, and 3,579 families living in the city. The racial makeup of the city was 96.9% White, 0.5% African American, 0.2% Native American, 0.7% Asian, 0.3% from other races, and 1.3% from two or more races. Hispanic or Latino of any race were 1.5% of the population.

Of the 5,477 households 33.8% had children under the age of 18 living with them, 51.1% were married couples living together, 10.7% had a female householder with no husband present, 3.6% had a male householder with no wife present, and 34.7% were non-families. 28.6% of households were one person and 13.5% were one person aged 65 or older. The average household size was 2.42 and the average family size was 2.98.

The median age was 34.1 years. 23.9% of residents were under the age of 18; 15.5% were between the ages of 18 and 24; 23.1% were from 25 to 44; 22.1% were from 45 to 64; and 15.2% were 65 or older. The gender makeup of the city was 46.7% male and 53.3% female.

2000 census
At the 2000 census there were 12,998 people, 4,748 households, and 3,261 families living in the city. The racial makeup of the city was 97.92% White, 0.40% African American, 0.15% Native American, 0.51% Asian, 0.07% Pacific Islander, 0.18% from other races, and 0.78% from two or more races. Hispanic or Latino of any race were 0.85%.

Of the 4,748 households 34.2% had children under the age of 18 living with them, 55.2% were married couples living together, 10.2% had a female householder with no husband present, and 31.3% were non-families. 26.5% of households were one person and 12.3% were one person aged 65 or older. The average household size was 2.44 and the average family size was 2.94.

The age distribution was 23.8% under the age of 18, 15.8% from 18 to 24, 25.3% from 25 to 44, 19.8% from 45 to 64, and 15.4% 65 or older. The median age was 34 years. For every 100 females, there were 89.1 males. For every 100 females age 18 and over, there were 85.9 males.

The median household income was $43,725 and the median family income was $52,238. Males had a median income of $36,945 versus $24,401 for females. The per capita income for the city was $19,574. About 5.6% of families and 7.2% of the population were below the poverty line, including 9.3% of those under age 18 and 5.9% of those age 65 or over.

Religion

21.4%-Catholic

64.5%-Protestant

14.1%-non affiliated

Current elected officials 
City Council:

Arts and culture
Indianola is also the home of the National Balloon Classic and National Balloon Museum.

Points of interest 

 Buxton Park Arboretum
 Des Moines Metro Opera
 Summerset Winery
 Simpson College
 U.S. Ballooning Hall of Fame

Education

Public school system
Indianola is served by the Indianola Community School District.

Indianola has four elementary schools:

Indianola Middle School is the only middle school.
Indianola High School is the only senior high school.

Colleges and universities
Simpson College, a liberal arts college of the United Methodist Church, is in Indianola, and was founded in 1860.

Infrastructure

Transportation

Highways
Iowa Highway 92 runs east and west through the city and crosses US Highways 65 and 69 southeast of the central business district.

Railroads
Indianola no longer has railroad service.  At one time, it served as a terminal point for a branch line of the Chicago, Burlington and Quincy Railroad which came off the CB&Q mainline at Indianola Junction which was 4 miles west of Chariton. There was a brick and stucco depot that stood across the tracks from the Rock Island depot. This line was abandoned in the early 1960s.

The other railroad was the Chicago, Rock Island and Pacific Railroad which branched off a branch line from Carlisle, Iowa  which is just southeast of Des Moines to Summerset Junction a few miles north of Indianola and on into Winterset.  The Winterset to Summerset Junction portion of the line was discontinued in the early 1960s leaving the Indianola to Carlisle line in place.  There was a brick Rock Island depot just to the west of US Highway 65 & 69 in the center of Indianola.  This line maintained sporadic service until the Rock Island went bankrupt in 1980.  The line was then operated by the Chicago and Northwestern Railroad until the early 1990s at which point the line was abandoned back to Carlisle. The line was converted to the Summerset Trail from Indianola to Carlisle after abandonment.

The Rock Island and CB&Q lines both came in from the east and paralleled each other as they came into Indianola.  They could interchange cars and there was at one point, first class Pullman passenger trains came down the Rock Island and then moved to the CB&Q railroad to Chariton and on to St. Joseph Missouri.  The Rock Island purchased a portion of the CB&Q after it was abandoned.  Freight cars were sometimes stored there.

Air service
Scheduled passenger service and general aviation services are provided by Des Moines International Airport which is 13 miles NW of Indianola.  There are two privately-owned airports near Indianola.  Nash Field is 4 miles south of Indianola and is open to the public. Laverty Field is 3 miles north of Indianola and requires prior permission to land.

Notable people

Casey Blake, baseball player and assistant coach for the Indianola High School girls basketball team
Todd Blythe, former football player for the Arena Football League, NFL, and the Canadian Football League
George Washington Carver, botanical researcher and agronomy educator
Dayton Duncan, writer and documentary filmmaker
Junior D. Edwards, posthumous Medal of Honor honoree
Erasmus Haworth, geologist
James C. Hickman, actuary
Paul Homan (1893–1969), economist
John Paul Jones, painter
Lane Sisters, four sibling singers
Ralph Parcaut, wrestler
Steve Spray, golfer
Chris Street, Iowa Hawkeye basketball player
Edwin Edgar Voigt, bishop of the Methodist Church
Ilo Browne Wallace, Second Lady of the United States, wife of Vice President Henry A. Wallace
Ed Yost, inventor of the modern hot air balloon

Technology

Indianola has a municipal, Gigabit-capable, fiber optic network and entrepreneurial development programs that links STEM-related activities at its schools and Simpson College to the local tech economy.

References

External links

 
Official City of Indianola Website
Indianola Chamber of Commerce

 
Cities in Iowa
Cities in Warren County, Iowa
County seats in Iowa
Des Moines metropolitan area
Populated places established in 1849
1849 establishments in Iowa